Cepora bathseba is a butterfly in the family Pieridae. It is found on Kangean.

References

Pierini
Butterflies described in 1902